Meldrim Thomson Jr. (March 8, 1912 – April 19, 2001) was an American politician who served three terms as the 73rd governor of New Hampshire from 1973 to 1979. A Republican, he was known as a strong supporter of conservative political values.

Early life

Thomson was born in 1912 in Wilkinsburg, Pennsylvania, the son of Meldrim and Marion (Booth) Thomson, and was raised in Georgia and Florida. He was an Eagle Scout. Thomson attended Mercer University, Washington and Jefferson College, and the University of Georgia School of Law and was admitted to the practice of law in Florida in 1936.

In 1938, he married his secretary, Anne Gale Kelly, and together they had six children.

Thomson made his fortune publishing law books. In 1952, he founded Equity Publishing Corp., which published the laws of New Hampshire, Vermont, the U.S. Virgin Islands, and Puerto Rico in English and Spanish. In 1955, he moved his family to New Hampshire, where he became involved in local and state educational and tax issues.

Political career
In 1966, as chairman of the Orford School Board, Thomson refused to accept federal education aid because he said there were too many strings attached. He lost races for governor in Republican primaries in 1968 and 1970, running again in the 1970 general election on the third-party American Independent party. He finally won the governorship in 1972 as a Republican after a campaign in which he pledged to veto any new sales or income tax that was put on his desk, and he further promised not to raise existing taxes.

In his bid for re-election in 1978, Thomson lost to Democrat Hugh Gallen. Thomson considered running for the presidency in 1980, but instead ran for governor, again losing to Gallen. In 1982 he ran for governor as an Independent, getting just 1.7% of the vote.

Governorship

Thomson coined the slogans "Low taxes are the result of low spending" and "Ax the Tax" to represent his fiscal philosophy.

He was also a strong proponent of state sovereignty. When Thomson learned Massachusetts tax agents were at New Hampshire liquor stores taking down the numbers on cars with Massachusetts license plates, he had them arrested. When he learned that Maine had arrested a Portsmouth, New Hampshire lobsterman, in Maine waters, he began what was known as the "Lobster war." The conflict ended in the U.S. Supreme Court with the drawing of an ocean boundary between the two states at the mouth of the Piscataqua River.

In 1978, Thomson appointed David Souter to the Superior Court bench. Souter would later become a Justice of the Supreme Court of the United States. Thomson also appointed Ivory Cobb, the first African-American judge in New Hampshire state history.

Death and honors
Thomson died in 2001 aged 89 from Parkinson's disease and heart problems in Orford, New Hampshire.

In 2002, the state named both a state building and state road in honor of Thomson.  The state office complex on Hazen Drive in Concord was named "Meldrim Thomson Jr. State Office Complex." A 16-mile stretch of Route 25A, where his Mt. Cube Farm lined both sides of the road, was named the "Governor Meldrim Thomson Scenic Highway."

Controversies
During his governorship, and thereafter, Thomson took the following actions:

in 1976 and 1977 he ordered the flag at the statehouse to be flown at half-staff including on Good Friday to "memorialise the death of Christ on the Cross."
during the 1977 anti-nuclear demonstrations at the Seabrook Nuclear Power Station, he was brought in by helicopter to order the arrest of 1,400 protesters.
personally arresting speeders from his official car.
visiting South Africa in 1978 and then praising the government.
sending out a press release in 1977 saying that he wanted journalists to keep the "Christ" in Christmas and not call it Xmas, which, he asserted, was a pagan spelling of Christmas

Presidential bid
Thomson was one of Ronald Reagan's staunchest supporters in 1976, as the former California governor challenged President Gerald Ford for the Republican presidential nomination.  Thomson was dismayed by Reagan's announcement that he would select moderate Republican Senator Richard Schweiker of Pennsylvania as his running mate should he win the nomination.

After he was defeated for re-election in 1978, Thomson left the Republican party to form his own Constitution Party. However, after getting on the ballot in Alabama, Kansas, Utah, Wisconsin, and Maine, his campaign contributions dried up when it was evident that Ronald Reagan was going to win the Republican nomination for president. Thomson then ended his campaign for president and returned to the Republican Party.

References

External links
Thomson at New Hampshire's Division of Historic Resources

1912 births
2001 deaths
Deaths from Parkinson's disease
Neurological disease deaths in New Hampshire
Governors of New Hampshire
People from Orford, New Hampshire
People from Wilkinsburg, Pennsylvania
Mercer University alumni
Washington & Jefferson College alumni
University of Georgia School of Law alumni
New Hampshire Republicans
Republican Party governors of New Hampshire
New Hampshire Independents
New Right (United States)
20th-century American politicians